Turbonilla bushiana is a species of sea snail, a marine gastropod mollusk in the family Pyramidellidae, the pyrams and their allies.

Description
The shell grows to a length of  13.5 mm.

Distribution
This marine species occurs in the following locations at depths between 668 m and 2811 m:
 Cobscook Bay
 Gulf of Maine
 Northwest Atlantic
 European waters (ERMS scope)
 United Kingdom Exclusive Economic Zone

Notes
Additional information regarding this species:
 Diet: generally for group, planktonic and minute detrital food items through either suspension or deposit feeding
 Dimensions: maximum size of 11 mm
 Distribution: Georges Bank to Long Island, New York
 Reproduction: sexes are separate but are seldom conspicuously different externally; simultaneous hermaphrodites yet self-fertilization is prevented due to various morphological, physiological, or behavioral mechanisms; generally, marine gastropods shed their eggs

References

 Bartsch, P. 1909. Pyramidellidae of New England and the adjacent region. Proceedings of the Boston Society of Natural History 34: 67-113, pls. 11-14.
 Bush, K. J. 1909. Notes on the family Pyramidellidae. American Journal of Science 27: 475-484.
 Verrill, A. E. 1880. Notice of the remarkable marine fauna occupying the outer banks off the southern coast of New England. American Journal of Science (3)20: 390-403
 Gofas, S.; Le Renard, J.; Bouchet, P. (2001). Mollusca, in: Costello, M.J. et al. (Ed.) (2001). European register of marine species: a check-list of the marine species in Europe and a bibliography of guides to their identification. Collection Patrimoines Naturels, 50: pp. 180–213

External links
 Biodiversity Heritage Library (3 publications)
 Encyclopedia of Life
 ITIS
 World Register of Marine Species

bushiana
Gastropods described in 1882